The 15765 / 66 Siliguri Junction - Dhubri Intercity Express  is an Express train belonging to Indian Railways Northeast Frontier Railway zone that runs between  of West Bengal and  of Assam in India.

Coaches
The 15765 / 66 Siliguri Junction - Dhubri Intercity Express has nine general unreserved & two SLR (seating with luggage rake) coaches . It does not carry a pantry car coach.

As is customary with most train services in India, coach composition may be amended at the discretion of Indian Railways depending on demand.

Service

Routing
The 15765 / 66 Siliguri Junction - Dhubri Intercity Express runs from 
 via 
New Malbazar Junction
Banarhat Railway Station
Dalgaon Railway Station
Madarihat Railway Station
Hasimara Railway Station
Kalchini Railway Station

Tufanganj Railway Station
Golokganj railway station to 
Dhubri railway station.

Traction
As the route is going to electrification, a  based WDM-3D diesel locomotive pulls the train to its destination.

Incidents
On 29th September 2019, Siliguri - Dhubri Intercity Express Engine hits and injures an elephant between Banarhat and Nagrakata in Jalpaiguri district of West Bengal. The injured elephant later passes away after struggling for hours.

References

External links
15765 Intercity Express at India Rail Info
15766 Intercity Express at India Rail Info

Transport in Siliguri
Intercity Express (Indian Railways) trains
Rail transport in Assam
Rail transport in West Bengal